San Cristóbal de las Casas National Airport formerly  was an airport located  from the city of San Cristóbal de las Casas in the state of Chiapas, Mexico. It was operated by Aeropuertos y Servicios Auxiliares, a corporation of the federal government. It was also known as Corazón de María Airport.

In 2009, it served 1,249 passengers. This airport was little used because the Angel Albino Corzo International Airport (serving Tuxtla Gutierrez) is located only 50 minutes away.

The airport was closed in July 2010 due to structural terrain failures.

References

External links
 

Defunct airports in Mexico
Airports in Chiapas
San Cristóbal de las Casas